Kenneth Dale  "Ken" Forbus is an American computer scientist working as the Walter P. Murphy Professor of Computer Science and Professor of Education at Northwestern University.

Education 
Forbus earned a Bachelor of Science in computer science, Master of Science in computer science, and PhD in artificial intelligence from the Massachusetts Institute of Technology.

Career 
Forbus is notable for his work in qualitative process theory, automated sketch understanding, and automated analogical reasoning. He also developed the structure mapping engine based on the structure-mapping theory of Dedre Gentner. He is a fellow of the Association for the Advancement of Artificial Intelligence (AAAI) and the Cognitive Science Society.

References

Year of birth missing (living people)
Living people
Northwestern University faculty
Artificial intelligence researchers
Fellows of the Association for the Advancement of Artificial Intelligence
Fellows of the Cognitive Science Society
Massachusetts Institute of Technology alumni